Rivelles is a surname. Notable people with the surname include:

 Amparo Rivelles (11 February 1925 – 7 November 2013) was a Spanish actress. 
 Jaime Rivelles Magalló (1861 - 1918) was a Spanish actor and a theatre director.
 Rafael Rivelles  (23 December 1898 – 3 December 1971) was a Spanish actor.